Benjamin Loring Young (November 7, 1885 – June 4, 1964) of Weston, Massachusetts was a US lawyer and politician who served as the Speaker of the Massachusetts House of Representatives from 1921 to 1924.

Born in Weston in 1885,  Young graduated from Harvard College in 1907 and Harvard Law School in 1911. Following nine years of legal practice, Young retired from the law. In 1910, Young was elected a Selectman of the Town of Weston, Massachusetts, a position he held for thirty-six years. Young was elected as a Republican to the Massachusetts House of Representatives in 1915, serving from 1916–24. Young served on the Ways and Means Committee in 1916, and as the chairman of the Recess Committee on State Finances in 1917. In 1928, Young ran unsuccessfully for US Senator. Young was on the Board of Parole and Advisory Board of Pardons for the State Prison and Massachusetts Reformatory from 1913 to 1915, and the chairman of the State Board of Probation from 1927–42, a US Referee in Bankruptcy from 1925–41, and a member of the Harvard Board of Overseers from 1922-28.

On June 26, 1933 Young was a delegate to, and the president of, the Massachusetts Convention  that ratified the Twenty-first Amendment to the United States Constitution.

Young married Mary Coolidge Hall in 1908; they divorced in 1935. They had four children: Barbara, Charlotte, Lorraine, and Benjamin Loring, Jr. He died in Boston on  June 4, 1964.

See also
 1916 Massachusetts legislature
 1917 Massachusetts legislature
 1918 Massachusetts legislature
 1919 Massachusetts legislature
 1921–1922 Massachusetts legislature
 1923–1924 Massachusetts legislature

References

Speakers of the Massachusetts House of Representatives
Republican Party members of the Massachusetts House of Representatives
1885 births
1964 deaths
Harvard Law School alumni
People from Weston, Massachusetts
Massachusetts lawyers
20th-century American politicians
Harvard College alumni
20th-century American lawyers